Format of entries is:
 ICAO (IATA) – Airport Name – Airport Location

VA VE VI VO - India 
 Note: ICAO codes for India start with VA, VE, VI and VO.

VC - Sri Lanka 

 VCBI (CMB) – Bandaranaike International Airport – Colombo
 VCCA (ACJ) – Anuradhapura Airport – Anuradhapura
 VCCB (BTC) – Batticaloa International Airport – Batticaloa
 VCCC (RML) – Colombo International Airport, Ratmalana – Colombo
 VCCG (ADP/GOY) – Ampara Airport – Ampara
 VCCJ (JAF) – Jaffna International Airport – Jaffna
 VCCK (KCT) – Koggala Airport – Galle
 VCCN       – Katukurunda Airport – Kalutara
 VCCT (TRR) – China Bay Airport – Trincomalee
 VCCV       – Vavuniya Airport – Vavuniya
 VCCW (WRZ) – Weerawila Airport – Weerawila
 VCRI (HRI) – Mattala Rajapaksa International Airport – Hambantota

VD - Cambodia 

 VDBG (BBM) – Battambang Airport – Battambang
 VDKC (KZK) – Kampong Cham Airport – Kampong Cham
 VDKH (KZC) – Kampong Chhnang Airport – Kompong Chhnang
 VDKK (KKZ) – Koh Kong Airport – Koh Kong
 VDKT (KTI) – Kratie Airport – Kratie
 VDMK       – Mondulkiri Airport – Mondulkiri
 VDPP (PNH) – Phnom Penh International Airport (Pochentong International) – Phnom Penh
 VDRK (RBE) – Ratanankiri Airport – Ratanankiri
 VDSR (REP) – Angkor International Airport – Siem Reap
 VDST (TNX) – Stung Treng Airport – Stung Treng
 VDSV (KOS) – Sihanoukville International Airport – Sihanoukville
 VDSY (KZD) – Krakor Airport – Krakor

VG - Bangladesh 

 VGBG – Bogra Airport – Bogra
 VGBR (BZL) – Barisal Airport – Barisal
 VGCB (CXB) – Cox's Bazar Airport – Cox's Bazar
 VGCM (CLA) – Comilla Airport – Comilla
 VGEG (CGP) – Shah Amanat International Airport – Chittagong
 VGHS (DAC) – Shahjalal International Airport – Dhaka
 VGIS (IRD) – Ishwardi Airport – Ishwardi
 VGJR (JSR) – Jessore Airport – Jessore
 VGLM – Lalmonirhat Airport – Lalmonirhat
 VGRJ (RJH) – Shah Makhdum Airport – Rajshahi
 VGSD (SPD) – Saidpur Airport – Saidpur
 VGSG (TKR) – Thakurgaon Airport – Thakurgaon
 VGSH (ZHM) – Shamshernagar Airport – Shamshernagar
 VGSY (ZYL) – Osmani International Airport – Sylhet
 VGTJ (DAC - prior to 1981) – Tejgaon Airport – Dhaka

VH - Hong Kong 

 VHHH (HKG) – Hong Kong International Airport – Chek Lap Kok
 VHHX – Kai Tak International Airport (Closed)
 VHSK       – Shek Kong Airfield – Shek Kong (former RAF Shek Kong)
 VHSS (HHP) – Shun Tak Heliport – Sheung Wan

VL - Laos 

 VLAO (LVT) – Vientiane Airport – Vientiane
 VLAP (AOU) – Attapeu International Airport – Attopeu
 VLHS (OUI/HOE) – Ban Huoeisay Airport (Ban Houei Sai/Ban Houay Xay) – Ban Hat Tai
 VLKG (KOG) – Khong Island Airport – Khong Island
 VLLB (LPQ) – Luang Prabang International Airport – Luang Prabang
 VLLN (LXG) – Luang Namtha Airport – Luang Namtha
 VLOS (ODY) – Oudomsay Airport – Muang Xay
 VLPS (PKZ) – Pakse Airport – Pakse
 VLSB (ZBY) – Sayaboury Airport – Sayaboury
 VLSK (ZVK) – Savannakhet Airport – Savannakhet
 VLSN (NEU) – Nathong Airport – Sam Neua
 VLSV (VNA) – Saravane Airport – Saravane
 VLTK (THK) – Thakhek Airport – Thakhek
 VLVT (VTE) – Wattay International Airport – Vientiane (Viangchan)
 VLXK (XKH) – Xieng Khouang Airport – Xieng Khouang

VM - Macau 

 VMMC (MFM) – Macau International Airport – Taipa

VN - Nepal 

 VNBG (BJH) – Bajhang Airport – Bajhang
 VNBJ (BHP) – Bhojpur Airport – Bhojpur
 VNBL (BGL) – Baglung Airport – Baglung
 VNBP (BHR) – Bharatpur Airport – Bharatpur
 VNBR (BJU) – Bajura Airport – Bajura
 VNBT (BIT) – Baitadi Airport – Baitadi
 VNBW (BWA) – Gautam Buddha International Airport – Bhairahawa
 VNDP (DOP) – Dolpa Airport – Dolpa
 VNJL (JUM) – Jumla Airport – Jumla
 VNKT (KTM) – Tribhuvan International Airport – Kathmandu
 VNLD (LDN) – Lamidanda Airport – Lamidanda
 VNLK (LUA) – Lukla Airport – Lukla
 VNLT (LTG) – Langtang Airport – Langtang
 VNMA (NGX) – Manang Airport – Manang
 VNMG (MEY) – Meghauli Airport – Meghauli
 VNMN (XMG) – Mahendranagar Airport – Mahendranagar
 VNNG (KEP) – Nepalgunj Airport – Nepalgunj
 VNPK (PKR) – Pokhara Airport – Pokhara
 VNPR (-) – Pokhara International Airport – Pokhara
 VNPL (PPL) – Phaplu Airport – Phaplu
 VNRB (RJB) – Rajbiraj Airport – Rajbiraj
 VNRC (RHP) – Ramechhap Airport – Ramechhap
 VNRK (RUK) – Rukumkot Airport – Rukumkot
 VNRP (RPA) – Rolpa Airport – Rolpa
 VNRT (RUM) – Rumjatar Airport – Rumjatar
 VNSB (SYH) – Syangboche Airport – Syangboche
 VNSK (SKH) – Surkhet Airport – Surkhet
 VNSR (FEB) – Sanfebagar Airport – Sanfebagar
 VNST (IMK) – Simikot Airport – Simikot
 VNRR (TAL) – Talcha Airport – Rara National Park
 VNTH (TMK) – Thamkharka Airport – Thamkharka
 VNTJ (TPJ) – Taplejung Airport – Taplejung
 VNTP (TPU) – Tikapur Airport – Tikapur
 VNTR (TMI) – Tumlingtar Airport – Tumlingtar
 VNVT (BIR) – Biratnagar Airport – Biratnagar

VQ - Bhutan 

 VQBT (BUT) – Bathpalathang Airport – Jakar, Bumthang
 VQGP (GLU) – Gelephu Airport – Gelephu, Sarpang
 VQPR (PBH) – Paro Airport – Paro
 VQTY (YON) – Yongphulla Airport – Trashigang

VR - Maldives 

 VRAH (HRF) – Hoarafushi Airport – Hoarafushi, Haa Alifu Atoll
 VRBK (HDK) – Kulhudhuffushi Airport – Kulhudhuffushi, Haa Dhaalu Atoll
 VRCF (FND) – Funadhoo Airport – Funadhoo Shaviyani Atoll
 VRDA (NMF) – Maafaru International Airport – Maafaru, Noonu Atoll
 VREI (IFU) – Ifuru Airport – Ifuru Island, Raa Atoll
 VRMD (DRV) – Dharavandhoo Airport – Dharavandhoo Island, Baa Atoll
 VRMG (GAN) – Gan International Airport – Gan Island, Seenu Atoll
 VRMH (HAQ) – Hanimaadhoo Airport – Hanimaadhoo Island, Haa Dhaalu Atoll
 VRMK (KDO) – Kadhdhoo Airport – Kadhdhoo Island, Laamu Atoll
 VRMM (MLE) – Velana International Airport (Malé International Airport) – Hulhulé Island, North Malé Atoll
 VRMO (GKK) – Kooddoo Airport – Kooddoo Island, Gaaf Alif Atoll
 VRMR (FVM) – Fuvahmulah Airport – Fuvahmulah Island, Gnaviyani Atoll
 VRMT (KDM) – Kaadedhdhoo Airport – Kaadedhdhoo Island, Gaafu Dhaalu Atoll
 VRMU (DDD) – Dhaalu Airport – Kudahuvadhoo, Dhaalu Atoll
 VRMV (VAM) – Villa International Airport Maamigili – Maamigili Island, Alif Dhaalu Atoll
 VRNT (TMF) – Thimarafushi Airport – Thimarafushi Island, Thaa Atoll
 VRQM (RUL) – Maavarulu Airport – Maavarulu Island, Gaafu Dhaalu Atoll

VT - Thailand 

 VTBC       – Chanthaburi Airstrip (Royal Thai Navy) – Chantaburi (Chanthaburi)
 VTBD (DMK) – Don Mueang International Airport – Bangkok
 VTBF (PYX) – Pattaya Airpark – Pattaya
 VTBG       – Kanchanaburi Airport – Kanchanaburi
 VTBL (KKM) – Khok Kathiam Air Force Base – Lopburi
 VTBN       – Pranburi Airport – Prachuap Khiri Khan
 VTBO (TDX) – Trat Airport – Trat
 VTBP       – Prachuap Khiri Khan Military Airport – Prachuap Khiri Khan
 VTBS (BKK) – Suvarnabhumi Airport (Nong Ngu Hao Airport) – Samut Prakan (near Bangkok)
 VTBT       – Bang Phra Airport – Chonburi (Chon Buri)
 VTBU (UTP) – U-Tapao International Airport (Utapao/U-Taphao) – Rayong (near Pattaya)
 VTBW       – Watthana Nakhon Airport – Watthana Nakhon / Prachin Buri
 VTCC (CNX) – Chiang Mai International Airport – Chiang Mai
 VTCH (HGN) – Mae Hong Son Airport – Mae Hong Son
 VTCI (PYY) – Pai Airport – Mae Hong Son
 VTCL (LPT) – Lampang Airport – Lampang
 VTCM       – Ban Thi Airport (Lanna Airfield) – Chiang Mai
 VTCN (NNT) – Nan Nakhon Airport – Nan
 VTCO       – Lamphun Airport – Lamphun
 VTCP (PRH) – Phrae Airport – Phrae
 VTCR       – Old Chiang Rai Airport – Chiang Rai
 VTCS       – Mae Sariang Airport – Mae Sariang
 VTCT (CEI) – Mae Fah Luang International Airport – Chiang Rai
 VTPB (PHY) – Phetchabun Airport – Phetchabun
 VTPH (HHQ) – Hua Hin Airport – Hua Hin / Prachuap Khiri Khan
 VTPI (TKH) – Takhli Air Force Base – Nakhon Sawan
 VTPL       – Lom Sak Airport – Lom Sak / Phetchabun
 VTPM (MAQ) – Mae Sot Airport – Mae Sot
 VTPO (THS) – Sukhothai Airport – Sukhothai
 VTPP (PHS) – Phitsanulok Airport – Phitsanulok
 VTPR       – Photharam Airport (Potaram Ratchaburi Airport) – Photharam
 VTPT (TKT) – Tak Airport – Tak
 VTPU (UTR) – Uttaradit Airport – Uttaradit
 VTPY       – Phumipol Dam Airport – Phumipol Dam / Khuan Phumiphon
 VTSB (URT) – Surat Thani Airport – Surat Thani
 VTSC (NAW) – Narathiwat Airport – Narathiwat
 VTSE (CJM) – Chumphon Airport – Chumphon
 VTSF (NST) – Nakhon Si Thammarat Airport – Nakhon Si Thammarat
 VTSG (KBV) – Krabi International Airport – Krabi
 VTSH (SGZ) – Songkhla Airport – Songkhla
 VTSK (PAN) – Pattani Airport – Pattani
 VTSM (USM) – Samui Airport – Ko Samui (Ko Samui)
 VTSN       – Cha Eian Airport – Nakhon Si Thammarat
 VTSP (HKT) – Phuket International Airport – Phuket
 VTSR (UNN) – Ranong Airport – Ranong
 VTSS (HDY) – Hat Yai International Airport – Hat Yai / Songkhla
 VTST (TST) – Trang Airport – Trang
 VTSY (BTZ) – Betong International Airport – Yala
 VTUD (UTH) – Udon Thani International Airport – Udon Thani
 VTUI (SNO) – Sakon Nakhon Airport – Sakon Nakhon
 VTUJ (PXR) – Surin Airport – Surin
 VTUK (KKC) – Khon Kaen Airport – Khon Kaen
 VTUL (LOE) – Loei Airport – Loei
 VTUN       – Khorat Air Force Base – Nakhon Ratchasima (Khorat)
 VTUO (BFV) – Buriram Airport – Buriram (Buri Ram)
 VTUQ (NAK) – Nakhon Ratchasima Airport – Nakhon Ratchasima (Khorat)
 VTUR       – Rob Muang Airport – Roi Et (Roiet)
 VTUU (UBP) – Ubon Ratchathani Airport – Ubon Ratchathani
 VTUV (ROI) – Roi Et Airport (Roiet Airport) – Roi Et (Roiet)
 VTUW (KOP) – Nakhon Phanom Airport – Nakhon Phanom

VV - Vietnam 

Airport in italic is not used for civil, strikethough is abandoned
 VV03 – Kien An Airport – Hai Phong
 VVBH – Bien Hoa Airport – Bien Hoa
 VVBM (BMV) – Buon Ma Thuot Airport – Buôn Ma Thuột
 VVCA (VCL) – Chu Lai International Airport – Chu Lai
 VVCI (HPH) – Cat Bi International Airport – Hai Phong
 VVCL  – Cam Ly Airport – Da Lat
 VVCM (CAH) – Cà Mau Airport – Cà Mau
 VVCR (CXR) – Cam Ranh International Airport – Nha Trang
 VVCS (VCS) – Con Dao Airport – Côn Đảo
 VVCT (VCA) – Can Tho International Airport – Cần Thơ
 VVDB (DIN) – Dien Bien Phu Airport – Điện Biên Phủ
 VVDH (VDH) – Dong Hoi Airport – Đồng Hới
 VVDL (DLI) – Lien Khuong Airport – Da Lat
 VVDN (DAD) – Da Nang International Airport – Da Nang
 VVGL – Gia Lam Airport – Hanoi
 VVKP – Kép Air Base – Bac Giang
 VVNB (HAN) – Noi Bai International Airport – Hanoi
 VVNS (SQH) – Nà Sản Airport – Sơn La
 VVNT (NHA) – Nha Trang Airport – Nha Trang
 VVPB (HUI) – Phu Bai International Airport – Huế
 VVPC (UIH) – Phu Cat Airport – Qui Nhơn
 VVPK (PXU) – Pleiku Airport – Pleiku
 VVPQ (PQC) – Phu Quoc International Airport – Phú Quốc
 VVPR (PHA) – Phan Rang Air Base – Phan Rang
 VVRG (VKG) – Rach Gia Airport – Rạch Giá
 VVTH (TBB) – Dong Tac Airport – Tuy Hòa
 VVTS (SGN) – Tan Son Nhat International Airport – Ho Chi Minh City
 VVTX (THD) – Tho Xuan Airport – Thanh Hóa
 VVVD (VDO) – Van Don International Airport – Ha Long
 VVVH (VII) – Vinh International Airport – Vinh
 VVVT (VTG) – Vung Tau Airport – Vũng Tàu

VY - Myanmar (Burma) 

 VYAS       – Anisakan Airport – Anisakan
 VYBG (NYU) – Nyaung U Airport – Bagan (Pagan)
 VYBM (BMO) – Banmaw Airport – Bhamo
 VYCI       – Coco Island Airport – Coco Island
 VYCZ       – Mandalay Chanmyathazi Airport – Mandalay
 VYDW (TVY) – Dawei Airport – Dawei (Tavoy)
 VYEL       – Naypyidaw Airport (Ela Airport) – Naypyidaw
 VYGG (GAW) – Gangaw Airport – Gangaw
 VYGW (GWA) – Gwa Airport – Gwa
 VYHB       – Hmawby Airport (military) – Hmawby
 VYHH (HEH) – Heho Airport – Heho
 VYHL (HOX) – Homalin Airport – Homalin (Hommalin)
 VYHN (TIO) – Tilin Airport – Tilin
 VYKG (KET) – Kengtung Airport – Kengtung (Kengtong)
 VYKI (KHM) – Khamti Airport – Khamti
 VYKL (KMV) – Kalaymyo Airport – Kalaymyo (Kalemyo)
 VYKP (KYP) – Kyaukpyu Airport – Kyaukpyu
 VYKT (KAW) – Kawthaung Airport – Kawthaung (Kawthoung)
 VYKU (KYT) – Kyauktu Airport – Kyauktu
 VYLK (LIW) – Loikaw Airport – Loikaw
 VYLS (LSH) – Lashio Airport – Lashio
 VYLY       – Lanywa Airport – Lanywa
 VYMD (MDL) – Mandalay International Airport – Mandalay
 VYME (MGZ) – Myeik Airport – Myeik (Mergui)
 VYMK (MYT) – Myitkyina Airport – Myitkyina (Pamti)
 VYML       – Meiktila Airport (military) – Meiktila
 VYMM (MNU) – Mawlamyaing Airport – Mawlamyaing (Mawlamyine)
 VYMN (MGU) – Manaung Airport – Manaung
 VYMO (MOE) – Momeik Airport – Momeik
 VYMS (MOG) – Monghsat Airport – Monghsat (Mong Hsat)
 VYMT (MGK) – Mong-Tong Airport – Mong-Tong (Hong Ton)
 VYMW (MWQ) – Magwe Airport – Magwe
 VYMY       – Monywar Airport – Monywar
 VYNP       – West Nampong Airport (military) – Myitkyina
 VYNS (NMS) – Namsang Airport – Namsang
 VYNT (NYT) – Naypyidaw Airport – Naypyidaw
 VYPA (PAA) – Hpa-An Airport – Hpa-An (Pa-An)
 VYPK (PAU) – Pauk Airport – Pauk
 VYPN (BSX) – Pathein Airport – Pathein (Bassein)
 VYPP (PPU) – Hpapun Airport – Hpapun
 VYPT (PBU) – Putao Airport – Putao
 VYPU (PKK) – Pakokku Airport – Pakokku
 VYPY (PRU) – Pyay Airport – Pyay (Prome)
 VYST       – Shante Airport (military) – Shante
 VYSW (AKY) – Sittwe Airport – Sittwe
 VYTD (SNW) – Thandwe Airport – Thandwe
 VYTL (THL) – Tachilek Airport – Tachilek (Tachileik)
 VYYE (XYE) – Ye Airport – Ye
 VYYY (RGN) – Yangon International Airport – Yangon (Rangoon)

References

 
  - includes IATA codes
 Aviation Safety Network - IATA and ICAO airport codes

V
Airports by ICAO code
Air
Airports by ICAO code
Airports by ICAO code
Airports by ICAO code
Airports by ICAO code
Airports by ICAO code
Airports by ICAO code
Airports by ICAO code
Airports by ICAO code
Airports by ICAO code
Airports by ICAO code
Airports by ICAO code
Airports by ICAO code
 V